Bøgseth is a Norwegian surname. Notable people with the surname include:

Hallstein Bøgseth (born 1954), Norwegian Nordic combined skier
Jon Eilert Bøgseth (born 1959), Norwegian ski jumper

Norwegian-language surnames